Cecropterus doryssus, commonly known as the white-tailed longtail, is a species of dicot skipper in the butterfly family Hesperiidae. It is found in Central America, North America, and South America.

Subspecies
The following subspecies are recognised:
 Cecropterus doryssus albicuspis Herrich-Schäffer, 1869
 Cecropterus doryssus chales (Godman & Salvin, 1893)
 Cecropterus doryssus doryssus (Swainson, 1831)

References

Further reading

 

Eudaminae
Articles created by Qbugbot
Butterflies described in 1831